Maher Kanzari (born 17 March 1973) is a Tunisian football manager. He has played for Tunisia national football team.

Club career
He played in the Tunisian Ligue Professionnelle 1 with Stade Tunisien and Espérance de Tunis. He played also in the Saudi Professional League with Al-Ahli Saudi FC and in UAE Pro-League with Al-Nasr Dubai SC and Dubai CSC.

International career
With the National team he started in 1998, collecting 31 appearances in four years and scored 7 goals, he participated also in 1996 Summer Olympics in Atlanta and 2000 African Cup of Nations and reached the semi-final.

Coaching career
He succeeded with Tunisia national under-17 football team to qualify for the 2007 FIFA U-17 World Cup hosted by South Korea after reaching the semi-final of 2007 African U-17 Championship. He also achieved the round of the 16 after beating teams like Belgium and the United States making Espérance de Tunis appoint him as its assistant coach in 2007.
Following the departure of Faouzi Benzarti in 2010, he became coach of Espérance de Tunis, before giving way a few weeks later to Nabil Maâloul.

On 2 January 2011, he was named coach of CA Bizertin and was second of the 2011–12 Tunisian Ligue Professionnelle 1. On 8 October 2012, he was appointed coach of Al-Sailiya Sports Club to replace the German Uli Stielike.
He signed a contract to be the assistant of Georges Leekens in the Tunisian team in 2014.

He then went through a failed experiences with Stade Tunisien, CA Bizertin and Stade Gabèsien and approached them to get to the second division. He also trained the Saudi Ohod Club before being fired for unconvincing results.
In August 2018, he was appointed as assistant of Faouzi Benzarti with Tunisia national football team

Honours

Player
Espérance de Tunis
Tunisian Ligue Professionnelle 1: 1998, 1999, 2000
Tunisian Cup: 1999
 CAF Cup: 1997
 African Cup Winners' Cup: 1998

Manager
Tunisia U-20
 Africa U-20 Cup of Nations: Fourth place

References

1973 births
Living people
Tunisian footballers
Association football midfielders
Stade Tunisien players
Espérance Sportive de Tunis players
Al-Ahli Saudi FC players
Al-Nasr SC (Dubai) players
Dubai CSC players
Tunisian expatriate footballers
Expatriate footballers in Saudi Arabia
Expatriate footballers in the United Arab Emirates
Tunisian expatriate sportspeople in Saudi Arabia
Tunisian expatriate sportspeople in the United Arab Emirates
Tunisian Ligue Professionnelle 1 players
Tunisia international footballers
Footballers at the 1996 Summer Olympics
Olympic footballers of Tunisia
Saudi Professional League players
UAE Pro League players
Tunisian football managers
Espérance Sportive de Tunis managers
Club Athlétique Bizertin managers
Al-Sailiya SC managers
Al-Wakrah SC managers
Stade Tunisien managers
Stade Gabèsien managers
Ohod Club managers
Saudi Professional League managers
Tunisian expatriate football managers
Expatriate football managers in Qatar
Expatriate football managers in Saudi Arabia
Tunisian expatriate sportspeople in Qatar